Dana Underwood McLean is an American attorney, real estate agent, and politician serving as a member of the Mississippi House of Representatives from the 39th district. Elected in November 2019, she assumed office on January 7, 2020.

Early life and education 
Born in Russellville, Alabama, McLean was raised in Lowndes County, Mississippi and attended Stephen D. Lee High School in Columbus, Mississippi. She earned a Bachelor of Arts degree in French and international studies from the University of Alabama, followed by a Juris Doctor and Master of Laws in international law and business from the Stetson University College of Law.

Career 
McLean practiced law in Tampa, Florida before returning to Columbus to work as a realtor for Century 21. She was elected to the Mississippi House of Representatives in November 2019 and assumed office on January 7, 2020.

References 

Living people
People from Russellville, Alabama
People from Columbus, Mississippi
People from Lowndes County, Mississippi
University of Alabama alumni
Stetson University College of Law alumni
Florida lawyers
Year of birth missing (living people)